Johann Georg Gödelmann, (also Godelmann) (May 12, 1559 – March 20, 1611) was a German jurist, diplomat and demonological writer.  He was born in Tuttlingen, and died, aged 51, in Dresden.

Selected works 
 Disputatio de magis, veneficis, maleficis et lamiis, praeside Ioanne Georgio Godelmanno … respondente Marco Burmeistero … habita Rostochii XXVI. Febr. anni LXXXIIII. in collegio fratrum, Frankfurt am Main 1584, deutsch [tendenzielle Übersetzung] Frankfurt 1591
 De lites contestatione, Rostock 1578
 Prolegomena lectonium in Ciceronis libros de legibus, Rostock 1583
 Oratio de legum Romanorum dignitate adversus eos, qui, vel ob legum multitudinem, vel varias jurisconsultorum opiniones, a studio juris abhorrent, Rostock 1583
 De jure patronatus, Rostock 1585
 De studiis privatis in jure recte institudendis, Rostock 1588
 De Magis, Veneficis Et Lamiis, Recte Cognoscendis & Puniendis, Libri Tres, His accessit ad Magistratum Clarissimi et Celeberrimi I.C.D. Iohannis Althusij Admonitio, Bd. 1, Bd. 2 und Bd. 3, Frankfurt 1591; deutsche Übersetzung=
 Von Zäuberern/ Hexen und Unholden/ Warhafftiger und Wolgegründter Bericht Herrn Georgii Gödelmanni/ beyder Rechten Doctorn und Professorn in der Hohen Schul zu Rostoch/ wie dieselbigen zuerkennen und zustraffen: Allen Beampten zu unsern zeiten/ von wegen vieler ungleicher und streitigen Meynung/ sehr nützlich unnd nothwendig zuwissen / Jetzund aber allen liebhabern/ mit vorwissen deß Authoris … auffs fleissigste verteutschet/ mit einem sonderlichen Rathschlag und Bedencken gemehret/ alles durch M. Georgium Nigrinum […]. Frankfurt/Main 1592

Further reading 
 Hans-Peter Kneubühler, Die Überwindung von Hexenwahn und Hexenprozess, Diessenhofen 1977
 Sänke Lorenz, "Johann Georg Goedelmann – ein Gegner des Hexenwahns?" in Roderich Schmidt ed., Beiträge zur pommerschen und mecklenburgischen Geschichte, Marburg/Lahn 1981, pp. 61–105
 
 
 
 Johann Samuel Ersch, Johann Gottfried Gruber: Allgemeine Encyclopädie der Wissenschaften und Künste no. 71 p. 419
 Jürgen Michael Schmidt, Glaube und Skepsis. Die Kurpfalz und die abendländische Hexenverfolgung 1446–1685, Bielefeld 2000
 Alison Rowlands, Goedelmann, Johann Georg (1559–1611). In Richard M. Golden ed., Encyclopedia of Witchcraft. Santa Barbara CA 2006, pp. 448–449

External links 
 
 Gödelmann, Johann Georg. In: Lexikon zur Geschichte der Hexenverfolgung (accessed 26 February 2008)

1559 births
1611 deaths
People from Tuttlingen
People from the Duchy of Württemberg
Demonologists
Academic staff of the University of Rostock
Imperial counts palatine
16th-century German jurists
17th-century German jurists
Witchcraft in Germany